This article refers to the US Union General. For the English Historian, see James Williamson (historian)

James A. Williamson (February 8, 1829 – September 7, 1902) was a politician and lawyer who served in the Union army during the American Civil War, rising to the rank of brigadier general.  He received the Medal of Honor for his actions at the Battle of Chickasaw Bayou.

Biography
Williamson was born in Columbia, Kentucky in 1829.  When he was fifteen years old his family moved to Iowa, where he worked as a farmer, before studying law and being admitted to the bar.  In the years prior to the Civil War he served as the  chairman of the Iowa State Democratic Committee.

When the Civil War began Williamson volunteered in the 4th Iowa Volunteer Infantry Regiment.  Serving as a first lieutenant he fought at the battle of Pea Ridge where he was wounded on the first day of fighting there.  On March 4, 1862 he was promoted to lieutenant colonel and then on July 21, 1862 to colonel of the 4th Iowa.  Colonel Williamson and his regiment spent the fall of 1862 on garrison duty at Helena, Arkansas.  In December Williamson was part of William T. Sherman's force which attacked the Confederate forces at the Battle of Chickasaw Bluffs.  Williamson was again wounded and for his services here was eventually awarded the Medal of Honor in 1895.

Williamson recovered in time to take part in the Vicksburg Campaign and the following Siege of Vicksburg.  After the fall of the city, he assumed command of the 3rd Brigade, 1st Division, XV Corps until September, 1863 then commanded the 2nd Brigade, 1st Division, XV Corps at the Battle of Chattanooga.  Williamson's division, commanded by Peter J. Osterhaus was temporarily attached to the forces under Joseph Hooker and took part in the Battle of Lookout Mountain.  The division was returned to the Army of the Tennessee and Williamson led the 2nd Brigade during the Atlanta Campaign.  At the Battle of Jonesborough he was wounded in the hand.  On December 19, 1864 he received a brevet promotion to brigadier general of U.S. Volunteers, on January 13, 1865 a full promotion to brigadier general and on March 13, 1865 a brevet promotion to major general of volunteers.  Briefly during the summer of 1865 he commanded the District of St. Louis and was mustered out of the volunteer service on August 24, 1865, but was on an inspection tour of army posts in the West and did not find out until he returned in October 1865.

In 1864 Williamson had been elected chairman of the Iowa delegation to the National Republican Convention in Baltimore, but did not attend due to duty to the army.  After the War he resumed his law practice in Iowa. He served as Commissioner of the General Land Office from 1876 to 1881. During this time he served as chairman of the Public Land Commission, which was created by Congress in 1879. He later became President of the Atlantic & Pacific Railroad.  He was in Jamestown, Rhode Island when he died on September 7, 1902.

Medal of Honor citation

Rank and Organization: Colonel, 4th Iowa Infantry.

Place and Date: At Chickasaw Bayou, Miss., 29 December 1862.

Entered service at: Des Moines, Iowa.

Born: 8 February 1829, Columbia, Adair County, Ky.

Date of issue: 17 January 1895.

Citation
Led his regiment against a superior force, strongly entrenched, and held his ground when all support had been withdrawn.

See also

List of Medal of Honor recipients
List of American Civil War Medal of Honor recipients: T–Z
List of American Civil War generals (Union)

Notes

References
 Eicher, John H., and Eicher, David J., Civil War High Commands, Stanford University Press, 2001, .
 A Civil War Biography
 History of General James A. Williamson

External links

1829 births
1902 deaths
Union Army generals
United States Army Medal of Honor recipients
Burials at Rock Creek Cemetery
General Land Office Commissioners
American Civil War recipients of the Medal of Honor
People from Columbia, Kentucky
Iowa Republicans
Iowa Democrats